Alhambra Elementary School District provides education for more than 14,000 students in the Phoenix and Glendale areas of Arizona.  Alhambra has 15 schools.  These schools educate students from kindergarten to eighth grade.  The district feeds into Phoenix Union High School District.

The Alhambra Governing Board consists of President Adam Lopez Falk, Clerk Mari Alvarado, and members Cathleen O'Neil Franz, Robert Zamora, and Ray Martinez. Alhambra Elementary School District's superintendent is Mr. Mark Yslas.

History 
The Alhambra School District was organized on August 6, 1888.  The first school was a one-room brick building on Shady Lane, now known as 33rd Avenue, between Grand Avenue and Indian School Road.  Today, the Alhambra Elementary School District is no longer a small school on the west side of Phoenix.  They now serve over 14,000 students in preschool through eighth grades, and have 15 schools.

Most of the district is generally bounded by 19th Avenue on the east, 51st Avenue on the west, Indian School Road on the south and Bethany Home Road on the north, with some sections extending southward past Thomas Road, west to 59th Avenue and north to Glendale Avenue.

Schools

Alhambra Traditional School 

Alhambra Traditional School educates students from kindergarten to eighth grade.  Alhambra Traditional School is a top-ranked school in Arizona.  Alhambra Traditional is labeled as an excelling school.  Alhambra Traditional's principal is Tracey Lopeman.  Originally established as Westwood Traditional School in 1983, it was renamed Alhambra Traditional School in 1986. The school is located at 3736 West Osborn, Phoenix, Arizona 85019.

Andalucia Middle School and James W. Rice Primary School 

Andalucia Middle School educates students from fourth to eighth grades.  The school's principal is Mr. Raul Ruiz.  The school is located at 4730 West Campbell, Phoenix, Arizona 85031.

James W. Rice Primary School is a 2007 A+ School.  It educates students from kindergarten to third grade.  The school's principal is Rosa Berrelleza.  The school is located at 4530 West Campbell, Phoenix, Arizona 85031. Andalucia Primary School has now been renamed James W. Rice Primary School

Barcelona Elementary School 

Barcelona Elementary School began educating students in 1965.  BES educates students from kindergarten to eighth grades.  The school's principal is Amy Bradshaw.  The school is located at 6530 North 44th Avenue, Glendale, Arizona 85301. This school is also home to the *G.A.T.E program

Carol G. Peck Elementary School 

Carol G. Peck Elementary School educates students from kindergarten to third grade.  The school's principal is Melinda Schlosser.  The school is located at 5810 North 49th Avenue, Glendale, Arizona 85301.

Catalina Ventura 

Catalina Ventura is 2005 A+ School.  The principal is Melissa Gonzalez.  Teachers and staff at Catalina are best of the best like their well known and favorite junior high math instructor John Garcia.  Catalina's school environment is warm and welcoming, and student are well situated there.  Catalina Ventura is located at 6331 North 39th Ave in Phoenix, Arizona.

Cordova Middle school  

Cordova Middle School educates students from fourth to eighth grades.  The school's principal is Dr. Sharon Spearman. The school is located at 5631 North 35th Avenue, Phoenix, Arizona 85017.

Cordova Primary School educates students from kindergarten to third grade.    The school's principal is Pam Escobedo. The school is located at 6615 North 39th Avenue, Phoenix, Arizona 85019.

Granada East School and Granada Primary School 

Granada East School educates students from fourth to eighth grades.  The school's principal is Dr. Randy Martinez.  The school is located at 3022 West Campbell, Phoenix, Arizona 85017.

Granada Primary School educates students from kindergarten to third grade.  The school's principal is Stacy O' Rourke..  The school is located at 3232 West Campbell, Phoenix Arizona 85017.

Montebello School 

Montebello School educates students from grades K-8.  The school's principal is Nicole Durazo.  The school is located at 5725 North 27th Avenue, Phoenix, AZ 85017.

Sevilla Primary School and Sevilla West school 

Sevilla Primary School educates students from grades K-3.  The school is a 2007 A+ school.  The school's principal is Mandi Bilyou.  Sevilla Primary School is located at 3801 West Missouri, Phoenix, Arizona 85019.

Sevilla West School educates students from grades 4-8. The school's principal is Ms. Jennifer Brunch.  The school is a 2008 A+ school.  Sevilla West was chosen most of the times by district for special events for the district since Sevilla West has the largest multipurpose room in the district.  Sevilla West School is located at 3851 West Missouri, Phoenix, Arizona 85019.

R. E. Simpson School 

(R. E.) Simpson School educates students from grades 4-8.  The principal is Alana Ragland. Principal Ragland is a RODEL Principal and recognized as a leader of educational equity. The school is located at 5330 North 23rd Avenue, Phoenix, Arizona 85015.
During the tenor of Principal Ragland, Simpson emerged from its failing status to letter grade C within a three year trajectory. Simpson under the leadership of Alana Ragland became a Verizon Innovation School in 2019. Simpson was a trailblazer of STEAM with multiple opportunities for students to involve themselves in College and Career Technology experiences through Paxton Patterson (https://www.paxtonpatterson.com/), AVID and VILS.

Westwood Primary School 

Westwood Primary School educates students from grades K-3.  The principal is Mrs. Melissa McKinsey.  The school is a 2006 A+ school.  This is the site that housed the district's first back to basics school in 1983, it was later returned to a neighborhood school and the district traditional school relocated to the current Alhambra location. The school is located at 4711 North 23rd Avenue, Phoenix, Arizona 85015.

References

External links

 
 Alhambra Elementary School District at Google Maps

School districts in Maricopa County, Arizona
1888 establishments in Arizona Territory
School districts established in 1888